Kolpaçino is a 2009 Turkish comedy film, directed by Atıl İnaç, which stars Şafak Sezer as a rich kid who sets up an illegal casino in his parents home to help his friend pay off a mob boss.

Synopsis
Tayfun is an errand boy working for Ateş, one of the most powerful mafia bosses in İstanbul. Tayfun has always been envious of the life led by the spoilt children of the jet set to whom he sells drugs. One day, with the intent of hitting it big, he steals Ateş's money. Ateş finds out about this and threatens Tayfun that he will have to pay for it. Frightened, Tayfun goes to another mafia boss, Sabri, for some idea of how to get the amount he owes to Ateş. Sabri tells him that the best way to collect money is to run an illegal casino. However, all the venues run by Sabri are known by the police, so they need a "clean" place to set up the casino. Özgür, one of the kids Tayfun sells drugs to, is the son of a well-to-do family that lives in a large mansion in an upscale neighborhood. Their house is the last place the police would think of raiding, so Tayfun and Sabri go to Özgür's house to ask for his permission to turn the mansion into a casino. Özgür, for the sake of some adrenaline, agrees to turn his family's mansion into an underground casino while his parents are away on an overseas trip.

Main cast 
 Safak Sezer (Ozgur Abi) 
 Ali Sürmeli (Ates Abi) 
 Hüseyin Elmalıpınar (Huseyin)
 Abidin Yerebakan (Ekrem Abi)
 Kemal İnci (Mutehahhit Kudret)
 Güzin Usta (Efendi)

Release 

Reception

Box office 
The movie was number two at the Turkish box office for two weeks running and was the eighth highest grossing Turkish film of 2009 with a worldwide total gross of US$2,424,173. That figure has subsequently risen to US$3,002,945.

References

External links 
  for the film (Turkish)
 
 
 

2009 films
2009 comedy films
Films set in Turkey
Turkish action comedy films
2009 action comedy films